Tony Lopez (born February 24, 1963) is an American former professional boxer who competed from 1983 to 1999. He is a world champion in two weight classes, having held the IBF super featherweight title twice between 1988 to 1991, and the WBA lightweight from 1992 to 1993.

Professional boxing record

References

External links 
 

 

|-

|-

1963 births
Living people
American boxers of Mexican descent
Boxers from Sacramento, California
International Boxing Federation champions
World Boxing Association champions
World super-featherweight boxing champions
American male boxers